A flow battery, or redox flow battery (after reduction–oxidation), is a type of electrochemical cell where chemical energy is provided by two chemical components dissolved in liquids that are pumped through the system on separate sides of a membrane. Ion transfer inside the cell (accompanied by flow of electric current through an external circuit) occurs through the membrane while both liquids circulate in their own respective space. Cell voltage is chemically determined by the Nernst equation and ranges, in practical applications, from 1.0 to 2.43 volts. The energy capacity is a function of the electrolyte volume and the power is a function of the surface area of the electrodes.

A flow battery may be used like a fuel cell (where the spent fuel is extracted and new fuel is added to the system) or like a rechargeable battery (where an electric power source drives regeneration of the fuel).  While flow batteries have certain technical advantages over conventional rechargeable batteries with solid electroactive materials, such as independent scaling of power ( determined by the size of the stack) and of energy (determined by the size of the tanks), long cycle and calendar life, potentially lower total cost of ownership, 
all flow batteries suffer from inferior cycle energy efficiency (50-80%) compared to lithium-ion batteries. This inferior energy efficiency stems from the need to operate flow batteries at high (>= 100 mA/cm2) current densities to reduce the effect of the internal crossover (through the membrane/separator inside each cell) and to reduce the cost of power (size of stacks).

History 
The zinc-bromine flow battery is the oldest flow battery chemistry, with John Doyle’s patent US224404 filed on September 29, 1879. 
Zn-Br2 flow batteries have relatively high specific energy, and they were demonstrated as power sources for electric cars in the 1970s.   Walther Kangro, an Estonian chemist working in Germany, was the first to demonstrate in the 1950s flow batteries based fully on dissolved transition metal ions: Ti-Fe and Cr-Fe. After some initial experimentations with Ti-Fe RFB  NASA and some other groups in Japan and elsewhere selected Cr-Fe chemistry for further development. In order to reduce the effect of time-varying concentration during RFB cycling, mixed solutions (i.e. comprising both chromium and iron species in the negolyte and in the posolyte) were used. Among disadvantages of the Cr-Fe chemistry are: hydrate isomerism (i.e. the equilibrium between electrochemically active Cr3+ chloro-complexes and inactive hexa-aqua complex, which can be alleviated by adding chelating amino-ligands) and hydrogen evolution on the negode (which is mitigated by adding Pb salts for increasing the H2 overvoltage and Au salts for catalyzing the chromium electrode reaction).
In the late 1980’s Sum, Rychcik and Skyllas-Kazacos  at the University of New South Wales (UNSW) in Australia demonstrated the advantages of all-vanadium RFB chemistry, such as the existence of four oxidation states within the electrochemical voltage window of the graphite-aqueous acid interface, and thus the elimination of the mixing dilution, detrimental in Cr-Fe RFBs. UNSW filed several patents related to VRFBs, that were later licensed to Japanese, Thai and Canadian corporations, which tried to commercialize this technology with variable success. In 2022, Dalian, China began operating a 400 MWh, 100 MW vanadium flow battery, then the largest of its type.

Construction principle 
A flow battery is a rechargeable fuel cell in which an electrolyte containing one or more dissolved electroactive elements flows through an electrochemical cell that reversibly converts chemical energy directly to electricity. Electroactive elements are "elements in solution that can take part in an electrode reaction or that can be adsorbed on the electrode." Additional electrolyte is stored externally, generally in tanks, and is usually pumped through the cell (or cells) of the reactor, although gravity feed systems are also known. Flow batteries can be rapidly "recharged" by replacing the electrolyte liquid (in a similar way to refilling fuel tanks for internal combustion engines) while simultaneously recovering the spent material for recharging. Many flow batteries use carbon felt electrodes due to its low cost and adequate electrical conductivity, although these electrodes somewhat limit power density due to their low inherent activity toward many redox couples.

In other words, a flow battery is an electrochemical cell, with the property that the ionic solution (electrolyte) is stored outside of the cell (instead of in the cell around the electrodes) and can be fed into the cell in order to generate electricity. The total amount of electricity that can be generated depends on the volume of electrolyte in the tanks.

Flow batteries are governed by the design principles established by electrochemical engineering.

Types 

Various types of flow cells (batteries) have been developed, including inorganic flow battery and organic flow batteries. Under each category, flow battery design can be further classified into full flow batteries, semi-flow batteries, and membraneless flow batteries. The fundamental difference between conventional batteries and flow cells is that energy is stored in the electrode material in conventional batteries, while in flow cells it is stored in the electrolyte.
Patent Classifications for Flow Batteries have not been fully developed as of 2021. Cooperative Patent Classification considers RFBs as a subclass of regenerative fuel cell (H01M8/18), even though it is more appropriate to consider fuel cells as a subclass of flow batteries.

Inorganic

Inorganic full-flow 
The redox (reduction–oxidation) cell is a reversible cell in which redox-active species are in fluid (liquid or gas) media. Redox flow batteries are rechargeable (secondary) cells. Because they employ heterogeneous electron transfer rather than solid-state diffusion or intercalation they are more similar to fuel cells rather than to conventional batteries (such as lead-acid or lithium-ion). The main reason Fuel Cells are not considered to be batteries, is because originally (in the 1800's) fuel cells emerged as a means to produce electricity directly from fuels (and air) via a non-combustion electrochemical process. Later, particularly in the 1960's and 1990's, rechargeable fuel cells (i.e. /, such as unitized regenerative fuel cells in NASA's Helios Prototype) were developed.

Examples of redox flow batteries are the vanadium redox flow battery, polysulfide bromide battery (Regenesys),  iron redox flow battery (IRFB), and uranium redox flow battery. Redox fuel cells are less common commercially although many systems have been proposed.

Vanadium redox flow batteries are the most marketed flow batteries at present, due to the advantages they provide over other chemistries, despite limited energy and power densities. Since they use vanadium at both electrodes, they do not suffer cross-contamination. The limited solubility of vanadium salts, however, offsets this advantage in practice.  More importantly for the commercial success of VRFBs is actually an almost perfect match of the voltage window of carbon/aqueous acid interface with the working voltage range of the vanadium redox-couples. This assures the durability of the low-cost carbon electrodes and low-impact of side reactions, such as H2 and O2 evolutions, resulting in record-long calendar (many years) and cycle(15,000–20,000 cycles) lives, which in turn results in a record low levelized cost of energy (LCOE, i.e. the system cost divided by the usable energy, the cycle life, and round-trip efficiency). The long lifetimes of flow batteries allow for the amortization of their relatively high capital cost (due to vanadium, carbon felts, bipolar plates, membranes). The levelized cost of energy for VRFBs is in the order of a few tens of $ cents or € cents per kWh, much lower than of solid-state batteries and not so far from the targets of $0.05 and €0.05, stated by US and EC government agencies. The major challenges for the broad implementation include: low abundance and high costs of V2O5 (> $30 / Kg), the raw materials for VRFB; parasite reactions including hydrogen and oxygen evolution; and precipitation of V2O5 during cycling. It is the major driving force to develop alternative flow battery technologies.

Traditional flow battery chemistries have both low specific energy (which makes them too heavy for fully electric vehicles) and low specific power (which makes them too expensive for stationary energy storage). However a high power of 1.4 W/cm2 was demonstrated for hydrogen-bromine flow batteries, and a high specific energy (530 Wh/kg at the tank level) was shown for hydrogen-bromate flow batteries

In 2022, DARPA SBIR-funded Influit Energy announced a nonflammable, surface-modified nanoelectrofuel made of a metal oxide suspended in an aqueous solution. The material does not settle out of the solution, even at high concentration and features and energy density higher than Lion batteries. Operating temperatures are -40 to 80 °C. They require no lithium, heavy metals, or rare-earth elements.

Inorganic semi-flow RFBs 
The hybrid flow battery uses one or more electroactive components deposited as a solid layer. The major disadvantage is the loss decoupled energy and power as seen in full flow batteries from using a solid state electrode. The cell contains one battery electrode and one fuel cell electrode. This type is limited in energy by the electrode surface area. Hybrid flow batteries include the zinc-bromine, zinc–cerium, soluble lead–acid, and iron-salt flow batteries. Weng et al. reported a vanadium-metal hydride rechargeable hybrid flow battery with an experimental OCV of 1.93 V and operating voltage of 1.70 V, relatively high values among rechargeable flow batteries with aqueous electrolytes. The two electrolytes of different pH are separated by a bipolar membrane. The system demonstrated good reversibility and high efficiencies in coulomb (95%), energy (84%), and voltage (88%). They reported further improvements of this redox couple with achievements of increased current density, inclusion of larger 100 cm2 electrodes, and the operation of 10 large cells in series. Preliminary data using a fluctuating simulated power input tested the viability toward kWh scale storage. In 2016, a high energy density Mn(VI)/Mn(VII)-Zn hybrid flow battery was proposed.

A prototype zinc-polyiodide flow battery demonstrated an energy density of 167 Wh/L (watt-hours per liter). Older zinc-bromide cells reach 70 Wh/L. For comparison, lithium iron phosphate batteries store 233 Wh/L. The zinc-polyiodide battery is claimed to be safer than other flow batteries given its absence of acidic electrolytes, nonflammability and operating range of  that does not require extensive cooling circuitry, which would add weight and occupy space. One unresolved issue is zinc buildup on the negative electrode that can permeate the membrane, reducing efficiency. Because of the Zn dendrite formation, Zn-halide batteries cannot operate at high current density (> 20 mA/cm2) and thus have limited power density. Adding alcohol to the electrolyte of the ZnI battery can help with the problem. The drawbacks of Zn/I RFB lie at the high cost of Iodide salts (> $20 / Kg); limited area capacity of Zn deposition also losing the decoupled energy and power; and Zn dendrite formation.

When the battery is fully discharged, both tanks hold the same electrolyte solution: a mixture of positively charged zinc ions and negatively charged iodide ion,. When charged, one tank holds another negative ion, polyiodide,. The battery produces power by pumping liquid from external tanks into the battery's stack area where the liquids are mixed. Inside the stack, zinc ions pass through a selective membrane and change into metallic zinc on the stack's negative side. To further increase the energy density of the zinc-iodide flow battery, bromide ions are used as the complexing agent to stabilize the free iodine, forming iodine-bromide ions as a means to free up iodide ions for charge storage.

Proton flow batteries (PFB) integrate a metal hydride storage electrode into a reversible proton exchange membrane (PEM) fuel cell. During charging, PFB combines hydrogen ions produced from splitting water with electrons and metal particles in one electrode of a fuel cell. The energy is stored in the form of a solid-state metal hydride. Discharge produces electricity and water when the process is reversed and the protons are combined with ambient oxygen. Metals less expensive than lithium can be used and provide greater energy density than lithium cells.

Organic 
Compared to redox flow batteries that are inorganic, such as vanadium redox flow batteries and Zn-Br2 batteries, which have been developed for decades, organic redox flow batteries emerged in 2009. The primary appeal of organic redox flow batteries lies in the tunable redox properties of the active components. As of 2021, organic RFB experience low durability (i.e. calendar or cycle life, or both). For this reason, only inorganic RFB have been demonstrated on a commercial scale.

Organic redox flow batteries can be further classified into aqueous (AORFBs) and non-aqueous (NAORFBs). AORFBs use water as solvent for electrolyte materials while NAORFBs employ organic solvents. AORFBs and NAORFBs can be further divided into total and hybrid organic systems. The former use only organic electrode materials, while the latter use inorganic materials for anode or cathode. In larger-scale energy storage, lower solvent cost and higher conductivity give AORFBs greater commercial potential, as well as offering safety advantages from water-based electrolytes.  NAORFBs instead provide a much larger voltage window and occupy less physical space.

pH neutral AORFBs 
pH neutral AORFBs are operated at pH7 conditions, typically using NaCl as a supporting electrolyte. At pH neutral conditions, organic and organometallic molecules are more stable than at corrosive acidic and alkaline conditions. For example, K4[Fe(CN)], a common catholyte used in AORFBs, is not stable in alkaline solutions but is at pH neutral conditions.

AORFBs used methyl viologen as an anolyte and 4-hydroxy-2,2,6,6-tetramethylpiperidin-1-oxyl as a catholyte at pH neutral conditions, plus NaCL and a low-cost anion exchange membrane. This MV/TEMPO system has the highest cell voltage, 1.25V, and, possibly, lowest capital cost ($180/kWh) reported for AORFBs. The aqueous liquid electrolytes were designed as a drop-in replacement for current systems without replacing existing infrastructure. A 600-milliwatt test battery was stable for 100 cycles with nearly 100 percent efficiency at current densities ranging from 20 to 100 mA/cm, with optimal performance rated at 40–50mA, at which about 70% of the battery's original voltage was retained. Neutral AORFBs can be more environmentally friendly than acid or alkaline AORFBs while showing electrochemical performance comparable to corrosive RFBs. The MV/TEMPO AORFB has an energy density of 8.4Wh/L with the limitation on the TEMPO side. Viologen-based flow batteries have been mainly developed by Liu’s group at Utah State University. In 2019, the group reported an ultralight sulfonate-viologen/ferrocyanide AORFB stable for 1000 cycles at an energy density of 10 Wh/L, so far the most stable, energy dense AORFB.

Acidic AORFBs 
Quinones and their derivatives are the basis of many organic redox systems. In one study, 1,2-dihydrobenzoquinone-3,5-disulfonic acid (BQDS) and 1,4-dihydrobenzoquinone-2-sulfonic acid (BQS) were employed as cathodes, and conventional Pb/PbSO4 was the anolyte in a hybrid acid AORFB. Quinones accept two units of electrical charge, compared with one in conventional catholyte, implying that such a battery could store twice as much energy in a given volume.

Another quinone 9,10-Anthraquinone-2,7-disulfonic acid (AQDS), has been evaluated. AQDS undergoes rapid, reversible two-electron/two-proton reduction on a glassy carbon electrode in sulfuric acid. An aqueous flow battery with inexpensive carbon electrodes, combining the quinone/hydroquinone couple with the / redox couple, yields a peak galvanic power density exceeding 6,000 W/m2 at 13,000 A/m2. Cycling showed > 99% storage capacity retention per cycle. Volumetric energy density was over 20 Wh/L. Anthraquinone-2-sulfonic acid and anthraquinone-2,6-disulfonic acid on the negative side and 1,2-dihydrobenzoquinone- 3,5-disulfonic acid on the positive side avoids the use of hazardous Br2. The battery was claimed to last for 1,000 cycles without degradation. While this system appears robust, it has a low cell voltage (ca. 0.55V) and a low energy density (< 4Wh/L).

Hydrobromic acid used as an electrolyte has been replaced with a less toxic alkaline solution (1M KOH) and ferrocyanide. The higher pH is less corrosive, allowing the use of inexpensive polymer tanks. The increased electrical resistance in the membrane was compensated increased voltage. The cell voltage was 1.2V. The cell's efficiency exceeded 99%, while round-trip efficiency measured 84%. The battery offered an expected lifetime of at least 1,000 cycles. Its theoretic energy density was 19Wh/L. Ferrocyanide's chemical stability in high pH KOH solution without forming Fe(OH) or Fe(OH) needs to be verified before scale-up.

Integrating both anolyte and catholyte in the same molecule has been examined. Such bifunctional analytes or combi-molecules allow the same material to be used in both tanks. In one tank it is an electron donor, while in the other it is an electron recipient. This has relevant advantages such as diminishing the effect of crossover. Thus, quinone diaminoanthraquinone and indigo-based molecules as well as TEMPO/phenazine combining molecules are potential electrolytes for the development of symmetric redox-flow batteries (SRFB).

Another approach adopted a Blatter radical as the donor/recipient. It endured 275 charge and discharge cycles in tests, although it was not water-soluble.

Alkaline 
Quinone molecules have been used as anolytes in alkaline AROFBs. Another anolyte candidate is fluorenone, reengineered to increase its water solubility.  A reversible ketone (de)hydrogenation demonstration cell operated continuously for 120 days over 1,111 charging cycles at room temperature without a catalyst, retaining 97% percent capacity. The cell offers more than double the energy density of vanadium-based systems. The major challenge for alkaline AORFBs is the lack of a stable catholyte, holding their energy densities below 5 Wh/L. All reported alkaline AORFBs use excess potassium ferrocyanide catholyte because of the stability issue of ferrocyanide in alkaline solutions.

Metal-organic flow batteries use organic ligands to improve the properties of redox-active metals. The ligands can be chelates like EDTA, and can enable the electrolyte to be in neutral or alkaline conditions under which metal aquo complexes would otherwise precipitate. By blocking the coordination of water to the metal, organic ligands can inhibit metal-catalyzed water-splitting reactions, resulting in higher voltage all-aqueous systems. For example, the use of chromium coordinated to 1,3-propanediaminetetraacetate (PDTA), gave cell potentials of 1.62 V vs. ferrocyanide and a record 2.13 V vs. bromine. Metal-organic flow batteries may be known as coordination chemistry flow batteries, which represents the technology behind Lockheed Martin's Gridstar Flow technology.

Oligomer 
Oligomer redox-species RFB have been proposed to reduce the crossover of the electroactive species, while using  low cost  membranes. Such redox-active oligomers are known as redoxymers. One system uses organic polymers and a saline solution with a cellulose membrane. The prototype underwent 10,000 charging cycles while retaining substantial capacity. The energy density was 10 Wh/L. Current density reached 100 milliamperes/cm2.

Another oligomer RFB employs viologen and TEMPO redoxymers in combination with low-cost dialysis membranes. Functionalized macromolecules (similar to acrylic glass or Styrofoam) dissolved in water are the active electrode material. The size-selective nanoporous membrane works like a strainer and is produced much more easily and at lower cost than conventional ion-selective membranes. It retains the big "spaghetti"-like polymer molecules, while allowing small counterions to pass. The concept may solve the high cost of traditional Nafion membrane, but the design and synthesis of redox active polymer with high water solubility is not trivial. So far, RFBs with oligomer redox-species have not demonstrated competitive area-specific power. It is not clear whether low operating current density is an intrinsic feature of large redox-molecules or not.

Membraneless 
A membraneless battery relies on laminar flow in which two liquids are pumped through a channel, where they undergo electrochemical reactions to store or release energy. The solutions stream through in parallel, with little mixing. The flow naturally separates the liquids, eliminating the need for a membrane.

Membranes are often the most costly and least reliable components of batteries, as they can be corroded by repeated exposure to certain reactants. The absence of a membrane enables the use of a liquid bromine solution and hydrogen: this combination is problematic when membranes are used, because they form hydrobromic acid that can destroy the membrane. Both materials are available at low cost. The design uses a small channel between two electrodes. Liquid bromine flows through the channel over a graphite cathode and hydrobromic acid flows under a porous anode. At the same time, hydrogen gas flows across the anode. The chemical reaction can be reversed to recharge the battery – a first for any membraneless design.
One such membraneless flow battery published in August 2013 produced a maximum power density of 0.795 mW/cm2, three times as much power as other membraneless systems— and an order of magnitude higher than lithium-ion batteries.

In 2018, a macroscale membraneless redox flow battery capable of recharging and recirculation of the same electrolyte streams for multiple cycles has been demonstrated. The battery is based on immiscible organic catholyte and aqueous anolyte liquids, which exhibits high capacity retention and Coulombic efficiency during cycling.

Nano-network 
Lithium–sulfur system arranged in a network of nanoparticles eliminates the requirement that charge moves in and out of particles that are in direct contact with a conducting plate. Instead, the nanoparticle network allows electricity to flow throughout the liquid. This allows more energy to be extracted.

Other chemistries 
Other flow-type batteries include the zinc–cerium hybrid flow battery, the zinc–bromine hybrid flow battery, and the hydrogen bromine battery.

Other flow-type batteries

Semi-solid 

In a semi-solid flow cell, the positive and negative electrodes are composed of particles suspended in a carrier liquid. The positive and negative suspensions are stored in separate tanks and pumped through separate pipes into a stack of adjacent reaction chambers, where they are separated by a barrier such as a thin, porous membrane. The approach combines the basic structure of aqueous-flow batteries, which use electrode material suspended in a liquid electrolyte, with the chemistry of lithium-ion batteries in both carbon-free suspensions and slurries with conductive carbon network. The carbon free semi-solid redox flow battery is also sometimes referred to as Solid Dispersion Redox Flow Battery. Dissolving a material changes its chemical behavior significantly. However, suspending bits of solid material preserves the solid's characteristics. The result is a viscous suspension that flows like molasses.

Redox-targeted solids 
Flow batteries with redox-targeted solids (ROTS), also known as solid energy boosters (SEBs), is another recent development. 

In these batteries either posolyte or negolyte or both (a.k.a. redox fluids), come in contact with a one or more solid electroactive materials, stored in tanks outside the power stack. The redox fluids comprise one or more redox couples, with redox potentials flanking the redox potential of the solid electroactive material. Such RFBs with Solid Energy Boosters (SEBs) combine the high specific energy advantage of conventional batteries (such as lithium-ion) with the decoupled energy-power advantage of flow batteries. SEB(ROTS) RFBs have several advantages compared to semi-solid RFBs, such as no need to pump viscous slurries, no precipitation /clogging , higher area-specific power, longer durability, wider chemical design space.  However, because of double energy losses (one in the stack and another in the tank between the SEB(ROTS) and a mediator), such batteries suffer from a poor energy efficiency. On a system-level, the practical specific energy of traditional lithium-ion batteries is larger, than that of SEB(ROTS)-flow versions of lithium-ion batteries. 

Zinc-bromine flow batteries are the oldest, their origin going back to 1880s.

Advantages 
Redox flow batteries, and to a lesser extent hybrid flow batteries, have the advantages of 
 independent scaling of energy (tanks) and power (stack), which allows for a cost/weight/etc. optimization for each application
 long cycle and calendar lives (because there are no solid-to-solid phase transitions, that cause degradation of lithiuim-ion and related batteries)
 quick response times
 no need for "equalisation" charging (the overcharging of a battery to ensure all cells have an equal charge) 
 no harmful emissions
 little to no self-discharge during standing
 full recycling of electroactive materials

Some types also offer easy state-of-charge determination (through voltage dependence on charge), low maintenance and tolerance to overcharge/overdischarge.

They are safe because 
 they typically do not contain flammable electrolytes 
 electrolytes can be stored away from the power stack.

These technical merits make redox flow batteries a well-suited option for large-scale energy storage.

Disadvantages 

Flow batteries have three main disadvantages compared to batteries with solid electroactive materials  
 low energy density (you need large tanks of electrolyte to store useful amounts of energy)
 low charge and discharge rates (compared to other industrial electrode processes). This means that the electrodes and membrane separators need to be large, which increases the cost of power.
 flow batteries have a lower energy efficiency, because they operate at higher current densities to minimize the effects of the cross-over (internal self-discharge) and to reduce the cost of power.

Flow batteries typically have a higher energy efficiency than fuel cells, but lower than lithium-ion batteries.

Applications 
Flow batteries are normally considered for relatively large (1 kWh – 10 MWh) stationary applications with multi-hour charge-discharge cycles. Flow batteries are not cost-efficient for shorter charge/discharge times. Some are examples of flow battery market niches are:
 Load balancing – where the battery is attached to an electrical grid to store excess electrical power during off-peak hours and release electrical power during peak demand periods.  The common problem limiting the use of most flow battery chemistries in this application is their low areal power (operating current density) which translates into a high cost of power. 
 Storing energy from renewable sources such as wind or solar for discharge during periods of peak demand.
 Peak shaving, where spikes of demand are met by the battery.
 UPS, where the battery is used if the main power fails to provide an uninterrupted supply.
 Power conversion – Because all cells share the same electrolyte(s), the electrolytes may be charged using a given number of cells and discharged with a different number. As battery voltage is proportional to the number of cells used the battery can therefore act as a very powerful DC–DC converter. In addition, if the number of cells is continuously changed (on the input and/or output side) power conversion can also be AC/DC, AC/AC, or DC–AC with the frequency limited by that of the switching gear.
 Electric vehicles – Because flow batteries can be rapidly "recharged" by replacing the electrolyte, they can be used for applications where the vehicle needs to take on energy as fast as a combustion engined vehicle. A common problem found with most RFB chemistries in the EV applications is their low energy density which translated into a short driving range.  Zinc-chlorine batteries and batteries with highly soluble halates are a notable exception.
 Stand-alone power system – An example of this is in cellphone base stations where no grid power is available. The battery can be used alongside solar or wind power sources to compensate for their fluctuating power levels and alongside a generator to make the most efficient use of it to save fuel.

See also 

 Glossary of fuel cell terms
 Hydrogen technologies
 Redox electrode

References

External links 
 Electropaedia on Flow Batteries
 Research on the uranium redox flow battery
 
 South Australian Flow Battery Project
 DC and AC characterization of a Vanadium Redox Flow Battery (VRFB)

 
Electrochemistry
Fuel cells
Battery types